The My December Tour was the fourth headlining concert tour by American pop rock recording artist Kelly Clarkson, and followed the release Clarkson's third studio album, My December (2007). Originally a large-scale summer tour timed to coincide with the June 2007 availability of the album, public career battles and poor ticket sales in North America led Clarkson to cancel it before it began. A considerably smaller-scale tour commenced in September 2007 and ran to April 2008, with the international legs in Europe and Australia remaining at arena venues.

Background

First incarnation
The tour was initially announced by both Billboard.com and Clarkson's official website on April 26, 2007.  It was scheduled for almost 40 dates in North America, running from July 7 to September 28, 2007,  beginning in Portland, Oregon's Rose Garden Arena, including such venues as the TD BankNorth Garden in Boston and Continental Airlines Arena in New Jersey, and concluding at the MGM Grand Garden Arena in Las Vegas.  For the first time, Clarkson would be playing in arenas instead of the smaller amphitheatres that her previous tours were staged in.  Describing the tour, Clarkson stated, "This will be the biggest tour I’ve ever done. It's all about the music – we’re bringing extra musicians and we’ll be making an arena environment intimate because I want the fans to be part of the show! And you’ll hear all your favorite hits too!!"  The show would feature a 36-row catwalk and b-stage, in order to make the large arenas more intimate for fans.  Mat Kearney would be her support act for the tour.

The tour was to be sponsored by Vitamin Water. The company set up an exclusive website, kellyallaccess.com, which offered a pre-sale through Ticketmaster as well as other cross-promotional activities with Clarkson.   Tickets went on sale on May 12 and prospects for the tour got caught up in Clarkson's very public career drama concerning the contents and commercial potential of My December, her relations with record company boss Clive Davis, and her falling out with her own management.

On Thursday, June 14, the tour was cancelled per Clarkson's official website, with her statement saying:

However, low ticket sales were acknowledged by promoters and her representatives as the reason for the cancellation.  LiveNation CEO Michael Rapino said: "Ticket sales have not been what we anticipated and we came to the realization that we had bit off more than we could chew. In the end, we are in the Kelly Clarkson business and for that reason we believe that this decision will only benefit her and her fans in the long run."

The My December album itself was finally released on June 26, 2007, and within a few weeks it was clear that its sales would be considerably less than those of her previous two albums. The only public performances to survive the tour cancellation were her five-song set at the Live Earth concert at Giants Stadium on July 7, 2007, and various promotional appearances on morning and late-night television programs in conjunction with the album's release.

Second incarnation
On September 4, 2007, a new My December Tour for Fall 2007 in North America was announced on via Billboard.com.  It was specified to play 26 dates in 3,000- to 6,000-seat theatres rather than the previous arenas. Ticket sales, when they happened, were now more fitting to the venue; her three shows at New York City's Beacon Theatre were all sold out, while her performance at the Tower Theater outside Philadelphia was virtually so.
Shows in Toronto, Minneapolis and Chicago also sold out.

Clarkson then added Australian and European legs to the tour, to take place starting March 2008, after the first leg of her 2 Worlds 2 Voices Tour with Reba McEntire.  The singles from My December had gotten a somewhat better reception in Australia than in the U.S., and Clarkson was following the strategy of scheduling dates there that the Dixie Chicks had following for their similarly sales-challenged Accidents & Accusations Tour of 2006. Tickets for the Australian tour went on sale October 8, 2007.  
On October 23, 2007, the full European lineup was announced and tickets went on sale immediately. German, Swedish and Dutch tickets went on sale for fans through a number of different ticketing websites and stores across the continent. Although Sony BMG UK set up an official pre-sale for fans through Live Nation, Ents24.com and Seetickets, Orange UK set up a "reserve ticket" system through WAP on their website, for registered Orange users within the UK.  There was a high demand for Glasgow and Manchester fans and a further date was added for each within a week.  Clarkson scheduled an appearance on the UK TV show This Morning on December 12 to promote the UK leg of the tour.

The show

As in the past, Clarkson's concerts held more in common with traditional rock concerts than with pop- or R&B-oriented "diva" productions.  The show began with a stage tableau of the cover of the My December album, complete with staircase laced with gnarly tree branches and Clarkson sitting in the big red dress while the band was frozen like mannequins.  Clarkson immediately shed the bulky red dress, however, and performed in an understated black pants and back top outfit.  Halfway through the show the main curtain closed, and Clarkson and selected band members performed a quieter mini-set of "Because of You", "Up to the Mountain", and "Be Still" in front of the curtain.  A mash-up of "Miss Independent" and Led Zeppelin's "Whole Lotta Love" AC/DC's "Back in Black" then played for a while over the sound system; when the curtain opened the set had been stripped to a techno-modern look, while Clarkson had undergone the minimal costume change of adding a black sleeveless vest.  The single encores segment began with a respectfully delivered "Sober" followed by the informal "Chivas" and then her biggest hit, "Since U Been Gone", the last of which typically featured sing-alongs or dancing fans pulled up on stage. In all she typically performed for 75 to 80 minutes.

The show's set list was dominated by My December and Breakaway material, with only "Miss Independent" and "Beautiful Disaster" appearing from her first album Thankful and the only indicator of her American Idol heritage her introduction to the Idol Gives Back showstopper "Up to the Mountain". Clarkson's concert audience in the U.S. was sometimes composed of high school and younger college age people, predominantly female, and preteen girls accompanied by one or both parents, but also sometimes connected with her radio audience, which includes widespread play on adult contemporary stations.  The music presented in the show was more conventionally rock-oriented than her concert audience profile might indicate. Clarkson's between-songs stage patter typically made only a few allusions to her career adventures with the My December album. At the start of the tour, she introduced My December material carefully. Near the close of shows, she thanked the audience for giving this chance to her to perform her songs, saying that all the other facets of the music industry paled in importance. She gave more extensive introductions for "Hole" and "Up to the Mountain", which she said did not fit her normal sound.

Rock critic Greg Kot analyzed the show as portraying three possible career paths for Clarkson: Goth vixen, pop princess, and ballad singer.  He suggested that the last of these was where her best chance at artistic growth lay, saying that her mid-concert quiet set had been "a revelation".

Opening acts
Jon McLaughlin 
Sean Kingston 
Mandy Moore 
Jamie Scott and the Town

Set list

 "Untitled I" 
 "One Minute"
 "Behind These Hazel Eyes" 
 "Don't Waste Your Time" 
 "Never Again" 
 "Maybe" 
 "Gone" 
 "Hole"
 "Addicted" 
 "Because of You" 
 "Up to the Mountain"  
 "Be Still" 
 "Miss Independent" 
 "How I Feel" 
 "Breakaway"
 "Walk Away" 
 "Sober" 
 "Chivas" 
 "Since U Been Gone"

Tour dates
 

Cancellations and rescheduled shows; (original tour dates)

Box office score data

Personnel
Band
Lead vocals: Kelly Clarkson
Keyboards, Musical director: Jason Halbert
Guitar: Aben Eubanks
Guitar, backup vocals: Cory Churko
Bass: Einar Pedersen
Drums: Chris Deaner
Backup vocalist, acoustic guitar: Jill Pickering 
Backup vocalist: Kate Rapier

Other
Management: Narvel Blackstock & Starstuck Management
Tour Manager: Tim Krieg
Production Manager: Allan Hornall
Hair & Makeup: Ashley Donovan
Security: Brian Butner & NPB Companies, Inc. 
Booking: CAA

External links
 Clarkson's Official Website

References

Kelly Clarkson concert tours
2007 concert tours
2008 concert tours